Count  was a Japanese statesman and the 7th Lord Keeper of the Privy Seal of Japan, active in the Meiji and Taishō period Empire of Japan.

Biography 

Hirata was born in the Yonezawa Domain, Dewa Province (currently Yamagata Prefecture) as the son of a local samurai. He was sent by the domain to Edo for studies, and subsequently fought in the Boshin War on the side of the Ōuetsu Reppan Dōmei. After the Meiji Restoration, was ordered by the domain to go to Tokyo and study at the Daigaku Nankō (predecessor of Tokyo Imperial University). After graduating, he was a student member of the Iwakura Mission of 1871 along with Makino Nobuaki. He later stayed in Germany to study at Heidelberg University (where he studied politics and international law) and Leipzig University (where he studied commercial law). He is the first Japanese with a doctorate degree.

Hirata returned to Japan in 1876 and served in a number of posts in the new Meiji government's Ministry of Finance, and later became Documentation Bureau Director of the Grand Council (Daijō-kan) and Legislation Bureau Director. In 1890, he was selected as a member of the House of Peers of the new Diet of Japan by Imperial command. 

He successively held important posts including chief secretary of the Privy Council, director-general of the Legislation Bureau, Agriculture and Commerce Minister in the first Katsura cabinet, Home Minister in the second Katsura cabinet, provisionary Diplomatic Investigation Board member, and Lord Keeper of the Privy Seal of Japan. 

Hirata was also very active in the movement of local agricultural reforms, an industrial cooperative program, and poverty relief projects, striving to protect the local country people against the inflationary economy after the Russo-Japanese War and World War I.

Family tree

References 
 Bix, Herbert P. Hirohito and the Making of Modern Japan. Harper Perennial (2001). 
 Duus, Peter. The Abacus and the Sword: The Japanese Penetration of Korea, 1895-1910 (Twentieth-Century Japan - the Emergence of a World Power, 4). University of California Press (1998). .
 Sims, Richard. Japanese Political History Since the Meiji Renovation 1868-2000. Palgrave Macmillan. 

1849 births
1925 deaths
Government ministers of Japan
Ministers of Home Affairs of Japan
Members of the House of Peers (Japan)
Kazoku
People from Yamagata Prefecture
People of Meiji-period Japan
Uesugi retainers
People of the Boshin War